Mimela is a genus of shining leaf chafer belonging to the family Scarabaeidae subfamily Rutelinae.

Species
Species within this genus include:

 Mimela abdominalis
 Mimela aenigma
 Mimela amabilis
 Mimela amauropyga
 Mimela anopunctata
 Mimela antiqua
 Mimela argopuroensis
 Mimela arrowi
 Mimela atkinsoni
 Mimela aurata
 Mimela bicolor
 Mimela bidentata
 Mimela bifoveolata
 Mimela bimaculata
 Mimela blumei
 Mimela brancuccii
 Mimela cariniventris
 Mimela catolasia
 Mimela celebica
 Mimela chalcophora
 Mimela chinensis
 Mimela chrysoprasa
 Mimela circumcincta
 Mimela condophora
 Mimela confucius
 Mimela costata
 Mimela coxalis
 Mimela crocea
 Mimela cupricollis
 Mimela cyanipes
 Mimela debilis
 Mimela decolorata
 Mimela dehaani
 Mimela dentifera
 Mimela deretzi
 Mimela despumata
 Mimela dimorpha
 Mimela discalis
 Mimela discoidea
 Mimela epipleurica
 Mimela euchloroides
 Mimela excisipes
 Mimela exicisifemorata
 Mimela felschei
 Mimela ferreroi
 Mimela flavilabris
 Mimela flavipes
 Mimela flavocincta
 Mimela flavomarginata
 Mimela flavoviridis
 Mimela foveola
 Mimela fruhstorferi
 Mimela fukiensis
 Mimela fulgidivittata
 Mimela furvipes
 Mimela fusania
 Mimela fusciventris
 Mimela gabonensis
 Mimela gentingensis
 Mimela glabra
 Mimela globosa
 Mimela grubaueri
 Mimela hauseri
 Mimela heterochropus
 Mimela hirtipyga
 Mimela holochalcea
 Mimela holosericea
 Mimela horsfieldi
 Mimela ignicauda
 Mimela ignicollis
 Mimela ignistriata
 Mimela immarginata
 Mimela inoei
 Mimela inscripta
 Mimela insularis
 Mimela iris
 Mimela javana
 Mimela junii
 Mimela kalesarensis
 Mimela klapperichi
 Mimela klossi
 Mimela laevicollis
 Mimela laevigata
 Mimela langbianica
 Mimela laotina
 Mimela leei
 Mimela leporalis
 Mimela lissoptera
 Mimela longicornis
 Mimela lutea
 Mimela luteoviridis
 Mimela macassara
 Mimela macleayana
 Mimela maculicollis
 Mimela malaisei
 Mimela malicolor
 Mimela margarita
 Mimela marginalis
 Mimela mercarae
 Mimela mirai
 Mimela mundissima
 Mimela nana
 Mimela ngoclinhensis
 Mimela nigritarsis
 Mimela nigrosellata
 Mimela nishimurai
 Mimela noramlyi
 Mimela nozomi
 Mimela nubeculata
 Mimela ohausi
 Mimela opalina
 Mimela pachygastra
 Mimela palauana
 Mimela pallidicauda
 Mimela parva
 Mimela passerinii
 Mimela pectoralis
 Mimela pekinensis
 Mimela piceoviridana
 Mimela pirosca
 Mimela plicatulla
 Mimela politicollis
 Mimela pomicolor
 Mimela prilca
 Mimela princeps
 Mimela puella
 Mimela punctulata
 Mimela pygidialis
 Mimela pygmaea
 Mimela pyriformis
 Mimela rectangular
 Mimela repsimoides
 Mimela rubrivirgata
 Mimela rufoprasina
 Mimela rugatipennis
 Mimela rugicollis
 Mimela rugulosipennis
 Mimela runsorica
 Mimela ruyuanensis
 Mimela sakishimana
 Mimela sauteri
 Mimela schoutedeni
 Mimela seminigra
 Mimela sericea
 Mimela sericicollis
 Mimela sericopyga
 Mimela signaticollis
 Mimela siliguria
 Mimela sparsepilosa
 Mimela specularis
 Mimela splendens
 Mimela sulcatula
 Mimela suspecta
 Mimela taiwana
 Mimela takemurai
 Mimela testacea
 Mimela testaceoviridis
 Mimela tonkinensis
 Mimela trichiopyga
 Mimela tristicula
 Mimela uenoi
 Mimela unicolor
 Mimela ussuriensis
 Mimela werneri
 Mimela vernicata
 Mimela vicaria
 Mimela viridilatera
 Mimela viriditestacea
 Mimela vitalisi
 Mimela vittaticollis
 Mimela xanthorrhina
 Mimela xanthorrhoea
 Mimela xutholoma
 Mimela yonaguniensis
 Mimela yunnana
 Mimela zorni

References 

Rutelinae
Beetles of Europe